The Pro Golf Tour, formerly the EPD Tour (European Professional Development Tour), is a developmental professional golf tour based in Germany. It is a third-level tour, the highest level of men's golf in Europe being the European Tour, and the second level being the Challenge Tour. The other third-level tours in Europe are the United Kingdom-based PGA EuroPro Tour, the Alps Tour, which is sanctioned by the national golf unions of several countries, including France and Italy, and the Nordic Golf League in the Nordic countries. Beginning in July 2015, the four third-level tours carry Official World Golf Ranking points.

The EPD Tour was established by Canadian golf professional Wayne Hachey in 1997 and has been recognised as an official third level tour by the PGA European Tour since 2001. In 2005 the PGA of Germany took over the EPD Tour.

The top ten players on the Order of Merit are awarded a bypass to the second stage of European Tour Qualifying School. The five leading players earn an additional perk with status on the second-tier Challenge Tour.

EPD Tour alumni include major winner Martin Kaymer, as well as Tobias Dier and Marcel Siem, who have both won on the European Tour.

Order of Merit winners

Notes

References

External links

Professional golf tours
Golf in Germany